Qanqoli, also rendered as Kanguli or Kanghuli, may refer to:
 Qanqoli-ye Olya
 Qanqoli-ye Sofla